I Heart Huckabees (stylized as I ♥ Huckabees; also I Love Huckabees) is a 2004 independent black comedy film directed and produced by David O. Russell, who co-wrote the screenplay with Jeff Baena.

A self-described "existential comedy", I Heart Huckabees follows a pair of detectives (Dustin Hoffman and Lily Tomlin), hired to investigate the meaning of the life of their clients (Jude Law, Jason Schwartzman, Mark Wahlberg, and Naomi Watts). As the different investigations cross paths, their rival and nemesis (Isabelle Huppert) tries to drag their clients into her own views on the meaning of their lives.

Plot
Young Albert Markovski heads the local chapter of the "Open Spaces Coalition" environmental group. One of their current projects is stopping the building of a new chain store "big-box" department stores, Huckabees.

Albert is a rival of Brad Stand, a shallow executive at Huckabees. Brad infiltrates Open Spaces and charismatically displaces Albert as the leader. Dawn Campbell is Brad's live-in girlfriend and the face and voice of Huckabees, appearing in all of the store's ads.

After seeing the same conspicuous stranger three times, Albert contacts a couple of existential detectives, Bernard and Vivian Jaffe. They offer him their optimistic brand of existentialism—they call universal interconnectivity (combining romantic and transcendentalist philosophies)—and spy on him, ostensibly to help him solve the coincidence. Fireman Tommy Corn is another client of the Jaffes', with an idealistic, obsessively anti-petroleum-industry philosophy. They introduce Albert to Tommy as his 'other', and they become friends.

Tommy grows dissatisfied with the Jaffes, feeling they are not helping. Seeking out other possibilities, he ends up abandoning (and undermining) the Jaffes by introducing Albert to Caterine Vauban, a former student of the Jaffes who espouses a seemingly opposing nihilistic/absurdist philosophy.

Caterine teaches them to disconnect their inner beings from their daily lives and problems, to synthesize a non-thinking state of "pure being." Lifted from their troubles, they wish to keep that feeling forever. But she says it is inevitable to be drawn back into human drama, and the core truth of it is misery and meaninglessness. To prove her point, Caterine takes Albert into the woods to have sex, leaving Tommy behind. He finds out about it and feels hurt. She tells him that they found each other through all of the human suffering and drama. Tommy rejects this idea and leaves them, furious and lost.

Meanwhile, in Brad's further attempts to undercut Albert, he and Dawn meet with and are influenced by Bernard and Vivian. In the following days, Brad and Dawn rethink their entire lives: she rejects the modeling world, looking for deeper meaning, while he realizes his whole ascent up the corporate ladder is meaningless, as he has focused his whole life on trying to please others and not himself.

All the storylines collide when Brad's house catches fire. While the fire trucks get stuck in a traffic jam, Tommy arrives on his bicycle to put out the fire, which also trapped Dawn inside. As he saves her life, they fall in love. Meanwhile, Brad despairs at the destruction of his home, the symbol of his material success. Albert attains a sort of enlightenment when he synthesizes the two opposing outlooks of the Jaffes and Caterine to realize the cosmic truth of everything.

Brad, meanwhile, is fired from Huckabees, leaving him rudderless. Albert reveals to him that the fire started when he burned Brad's jet skis, then it spread to the rest of the house. He says they are no different, that everything really is inextricably connected, but that these connections necessarily arise from the often senselessly painful reality of human existence. Having realized this, he refers Brad to Caterine, believing she can help him as she did Albert and Tommy.

Albert and Tommy talk later about everything that has happened. Caterine and the Jaffes watch them from afar, concluding they can close both of their cases.

Cast

 Dustin Hoffman as Bernard Jaffe
 Isabelle Huppert as Caterine Vauban
 Jude Law as Brad Stand
 Jason Schwartzman as Albert Markovski
 Lily Tomlin as Vivian Jaffe
 Mark Wahlberg as Tommy Corn
 Naomi Watts as Dawn Campbell
 Ger Duany as Stephen Nimieri
 Isla Fisher as Heather
 Sydney Zarp as Cricket Hooten
 Jonah Hill as Bret Hooten
 Richard Jenkins as Mr. Hooten (uncredited) 
 Darlene Hunt as Darlene
 Kevin Dunn as Marty
 Benny Hernandez as Davy
 Richard Appel as Josh
 Benjamin Nurick as Harrison
 Jake Muxworthy as Tim
 Tippi Hedren as Mary Jane Hutchinson
 Altagracia Guzman as Mrs. Echevarria
 Saïd Taghmaoui as Translator
 Bob Gunton as Mr. Silver
 Talia Shire as Mrs. Silver
 Jean Smart as Mrs. Hooten
 Shania Twain as herself

The film features the screen debuts of Jonah Hill (in a minor role) and Ger Duany.

Production
Before directing his first feature, Spanking the Monkey, Russell intended to make a film  "about a guy who sits in the back of a Chinese restaurant with microphones on every table to surreptitiously listen to everybody’s conversations, then write perversely personal fortunes for each of the people." 

Hitting a writer's block, Russell could not figure out how to make the film work. In the meantime Russell was called for jury duty, after which he stopped writing the film. Ideas in the script stayed with him though and they would later form the basis for the Huckabee script. The final idea came to Russell in a dream where "This female detective she was not following me for criminal reasons, but she was following me for spiritual and metaphysical reasons." Russell, who makes a habit of writing his dreams down, knew instantly upon reading his summary of the dream that this was the story he wanted to pursue.

Incident between David O. Russell and Lily Tomlin
In March 2007, two videos were leaked onto YouTube portraying on-set arguments between Russell and Tomlin. When the Miami New Times asked Tomlin about the videos, she responded, "I love David. There was a lot of pressure in making the movie—even the way it came out you could see it was a very free-associative, crazy movie, and David was under a tremendous amount of pressure. And he's a very free-form kind of guy anyway."

Soundtrack

Jon Brion provided the score and seven original songs for the film. His unique methods for writing previous film scores (Punch-Drunk Love, Eternal Sunshine of the Spotless Mind) involved very close collaboration with the director. Through this process, David O. Russell was able to sit in the same room with Brion and watch an early cut of the film. Russell described what he wanted to portray and Brion would compose music to Russell's descriptions. The process can be seen on a featurette on the film's special edition DVD.

David O. Russell, while working with Brion, had come across Brion's first solo album, Meaningless. Russell has mentioned that Brion's album asks similar questions to the ones Russell was trying to ask with I Heart Huckabees. In particular, Russell notes that the questions on Meaningless are closer to the questions directed from Caterine Vauban's negative and dark point of view.

Many cues used in the film feature a Chamberlin, a keyboard instrument from the 1950s that replicates instrumental sounds using recorded tape.

Release

Marketing
In an advertising campaign for the film, four fictional websites were created. They were portrayed as if they were actual websites involving the characters and organizations featured in the film. Each website had a link called "Disclaimer" at the bottom that leads to FOX Searchlight's official website for the film. Websites were rendered inactive a few months after release, each now redirecting to FOX Searchlight's website.
 Huckabees Corporation: The "official" website for the chain of Huckabees stores. Featured the store history, announcements, three television ads featuring Dawn Campbell, and a banner promoting the Huckabees collaboration with the Open Spaces Coalition.
 Open Spaces Coalition: This website described the importance of the marshlands Albert Markovski is trying to protect, ways of aiding the cause. The site also contained poetry written by Markovski and downloadable flyers.
 Existential Detectives: The website promoting the Jaffes' detective agency. It explained the methodology of the detectives, had two case studies and an online questionnaire.
 Caterine Vauban: The website of Caterine Vauban, author of "If Not Now". The site contained reviews and excerpts from the book.

Box office
I Heart Huckabees opened in a limited release on October 1, 2004, earning $292,177 and ranking number 24 in the weekend's box office. The film was granted a wide release three weeks later on October 22, earning $2,902,468, ranking tenth in the box office. At the end of its run, the film grossed $12,785,432 domestically and $7,286,740 overseas for a worldwide total of $20,072,172.

Reception
The film received mixed to positive reviews from critics. Some critics were displeased with the existential subject matter and said the script was unfocused, while others celebrated its performances (especially Wahlberg as Tommy Corn) and originality. Review aggregator website Rotten Tomatoes gives the film a 63% rating based on 192 reviews, with an average rating of 6.30/10. The site's consensus states: "I Heart Huckabees certainly isn't for everyone, but audiences attuned to its quirky wavelength will find a singularly brainy screwball comedy that refuses to pander." Metacritic reports a 55 out of 100 rating based on 40 critics, indicating "mixed or average reviews".

In an article for New Review of Film and Television Studies film scholar, Kim Wilkins labelled the dialogue in I Heart Huckabees "hyper-dialogue," which is described as "intensified, unevenly fluctuating, and often ironically inflected use of dialogue in the place of action".

See also
 Deconstruction
 Dialectical monism
 Synchronicity
American Eccentric Cinema

References

External links

 
 
 
 

2004 films
2004 comedy films
American comedy films
British comedy films
2000s French-language films
2000s Spanish-language films
Environmental films
Existentialist films
Fox Searchlight Pictures films
Films about philosophy
Films directed by David O. Russell
Films produced by Scott Rudin
Films scored by Jon Brion
Films shot in California
Films shot in Los Angeles
Qwerty Films films
2000s English-language films
2000s American films
2000s British films